Sharifabad may refer to:

Armenia
Sharifabad, former name of Araks, Echmiadzin, a town in Armenia

India
Sharifabad, a village in Bihar district in Nalanda

Iran
Sharifabad Rural District (disambiguation), administrative subdivisions of Iran

Chaharmahal and Bakhtiari Province
Sharifabad, Chaharmahal and Bakhtiari, a village in Farsan County

Hamadan Province
Sharifabad-e Quzan, a village in Malayer County
Sharifabad-e Tajar, a village in Malayer County
Sharifabad, Hamadan, a village in Nahavand County

Isfahan Province
Sharifabad, Bon Rud, a village in Isfahan County
Sharifabad, Jolgeh, a village in Isfahan County

Kerman Province
Sharifabad, Anar, a village in Anar County
Sharifabad, Anbarabad, a village in Anbarabad County
Sharifabad, Rafsanjan, a village in Rafsanjan County
Sharifabad, Sirjan, a village in Sirjan County
Sharifabad, Pariz, a village in Sirjan County
Sharifabad, Zarand, a village in Zarand County
Sharifabad Rural District (Rafsanjan County)
Sharifabad Rural District (Sirjan County)

Kermanshah Province
Sharifabad, Sahneh, a village in Sahneh County
Sharifabad, Dinavar, a village in Sahneh County
Sharifabad, Sonqor, a village in Sonqor County

Khuzestan Province
Sharifabad, Andika, a village in Andika County
Sharifabad, Karun, a village in Karun County

Kurdistan Province
Sharifabad, Bijar, a village in Bijar County
Sharifabad, Chang Almas, a village in Bijar County
Sharifabad, Divandarreh,  a village in Divandarreh County
Sharifabad, Saqqez,  a village in Saqqez County

Lorestan Province
Sharifabad, Lorestan, a village in Lorestan Province, Iran

Mazandaran Province
Sharifabad, Sari, a village in Sari County
Sharifabad, Tonekabon, a village in Tonekabon County

Qazvin Province
Sharifabad, Alborz, a village in Qazvin Province, Iran
Sharifabad, Qazvin, a village in Qazvin Province, Iran
Sharifabad Rural District (Qazvin Province) an administrative subdivision of Qazvin Province, Iran

Qom Province
Sharifabad, Qom, a village in Qom Province, Iran
Sharifabad-e Gavkhuni, a village in Qom Province, Iran
Sharifabad-e Zand, a village in Qom Province, Iran

Razavi Khorasan Province
Sharifabad, Bardaskan, a village in Bardaskan County
Sharifabad-e Utan, a village in Chenaran County
Sharifabad, Joghatai, a village in Joghatai County
Sharifabad, Mashhad, a village in Mashhad County

Semnan Province
Sharifabad, Meyami, a village in Meyami County
Sharifabad, Shahrud, a village in Shahrud County

Sistan and Baluchestan Province
Sharifabad, Iranshahr, a village in Iranshahr County
Sharifabad-e Chah Kan, a village in Khash County

South Khorasan Province
Sharifabad, South Khorasan, a village in Birjand County

Tehran Province
Sharifabad, Iran, a city in Tehran Province, Iran
Sharifabad, Malard, a village in Malard County, Tehran Province, Iran
Sharifabad, Rey, a village in Rey County, Tehran Province, Iran
Sharifabad District, an administrative division of Tehran Province, Iran
Sharifabad Rural District (Pakdasht County), an administrative division of Tehran Province, Iran

West Azerbaijan Province
Sharifabad, Khoy, a village in Khoy County
Sharifabad, Showt, a village in Showt County
Sharifabad, Urmia, a village in Urmia County

Yazd Province
Sharifabad, Saduq, a village in Saduq County
Sharifabad, Aliabad, a village in Taft County
Sharifabad (31°24′ N 53°52′ E), Dehshir, a village in Taft County
Sharifabad (31°28′ N 53°47′ E), Dehshir, a village in Taft County
Sharifabad, Ardakan, a village in Ardakan County

Zanjan Province
Sharifabad, Zanjan, a village in Abhar County

Pakistan
Sharifabad (Karachi), a neighbourhood of Karachi, Pakistan

See also
 Sharafabad (disambiguation)